Kevin Moulder is in American college baseball coach, most recently serving as head coach of the Murray State Racers baseball team. He played at STLCC and Murray State prior to turning to coaching.  After two seasons as an assistant at the junior college level, he earned the head coaching job at Division II Central Missouri.  After two seasons, he became an assistant at Saint Louis.  In 2015, he was named head coach at Murray State. After four losing seasons as the Head Coach at Murray State, Moulder was relieved of his duties. Moulder now serves as the head coach of the Jefferson College (Missouri) Vikings in Hillsboro, Missouri

References

Baseball pitchers
Central Missouri Mules baseball coaches
Lake City Timberwolves baseball coaches
Living people
Jefferson Vikings baseball coaches
Murray State Racers baseball coaches
Murray State Racers baseball players
Saint Louis Billikens baseball coaches
STLCC Archers baseball coaches
STLCC Archers baseball players
1980 births